Nototriton limnospectator is a species of salamander in the family Plethodontidae. It is also called the Santa Barbara moss salamander.
It is endemic to Honduras.

Habitat
The natural habitat of N. limnospectator is subtropical or tropical moist montane forests.

Conservation status
N. limnospectator is threatened by habitat loss.

Sources

Nototriton
Amphibians of Honduras
Endemic fauna of Honduras
Endangered fauna of North America
Amphibians described in 1998
Taxonomy articles created by Polbot